Geodercodes is a genus of broad-nosed weevils in the beetle family Curculionidae. There are at least two described species in Geodercodes.

Species
These two species belong to the genus Geodercodes:
 Geodercodes hispidus Horn, 1894 i c g
 Geodercodes latipennis Casey, 1888 i c g b
Data sources: i = ITIS, c = Catalogue of Life, g = GBIF, b = Bugguide.net

References

Further reading

 
 
 
 

Entiminae
Articles created by Qbugbot